Mike Kennedy Sebalu is a Ugandan politician. He is a former Member of parliament in the National Assembly of Uganda (his constituency being Busiro East), a former member of the African Union's Pan-African Parliament and a member of the East African Community.

He is a public speaker and member of the Rotary.

References

Members of the Pan-African Parliament from Uganda
Members of the Parliament of Uganda
Living people
Year of birth missing (living people)